Urkarakh (Dargin: Уркарахъ) is a rural locality (a selo) and the administrative center of Dakhadayevsky District of the Republic of Dagestan, Russia. Population:

References

Notes

Sources

Rural localities in Dakhadayevsky District